Souvik Gupta, known as "Savvy", is an Indian music director who has composed and sung songs for Bengali movies from both West Bengal and Bangladesh.

Career 
Gupta formerly played keyboard and sung for Kolkata-based rock bands Insomnia and Crystal Grass. He started his journey as a film composer in the year 2012 with the film Khokababu, composing the song "Khoka Chalu Cheez" sung by actor Dev. He was the composer for the theme song of the first ever Kolkata fashion week. In addition to composing for Indian film soundtracks, Gupta also composes music for Bangladeshi film soundtracks.

He is an electronics engineer and completed his bachelor degree from NITMUS in 2006. He passed out from secondary school from Nava Nalanda High School, south kolkata

Discography

Film Soundtracks

As Composer 

{| class="wikitable sortable"
|- 
|- style="background:#cfc; text-align:center;"
|Year
|Film
|Song
|Singer(s)
|Label
|Notes
|Reference(s)
|-
| rowspan="4" |2012 || Khokababu || "Khoka Chalu Cheez" || Dev || Eskay Movies || Along with Rishi Chanda, Priyo Chatterjee || 
|-
|Goray Gondogol || All Songs || Various Artists || || || 
|-
|Challenge 2 || "Pyar Ka Bukhar" || Suraj Jagan || Shree Venkatesh Films || Along with Jeet Gannguli || 
|-
| Bawali Unlimited || All Songs except Bawali Unlimited, Mon Ure Chole || Rupankar, Raghab Chatterjee, Sudipto || Saitronics || Along with Dev Sen || 
|-
| rowspan="4" |2013 || rowspan="2" |Khoka 420 || "Gobhir Joler Fish" || Abhijeet Bhattacharya, Akriti Kakkar || rowspan="2" |Eskay Movies || rowspan="2" |Along with Rishi Chanda, Shree Pritam, Shrijit || rowspan="2" |
|-
|"Mad I Am Mad" || Mika Singh, Saberi Bhattacharya  
|-
|rowspan="2" |Majnu || O Piya Re Piya || Arijit Singh, June Banerjee || rowspan="2" |Shree Venkatesh Films || rowspan="2" |Along with Rishi Chanda || rowspan="2" |<ref>{{cite web|url=http://tollywoodhamaka.com/news/after-five-years-hiran-and-srabanti-are-back-together-for-majnu.html|title='After five years, Hiran and Srabanti are back together for 'Majnu|website=Tollywood Hamaka}}</ref>
|-
|"Lonely Very Lonely" || Zubeen Garg  
|-
| rowspan="8" |2014 || rowspan="3" |Ami Shudhu Cheyechi Tomay || "Pakka Ghughu Maal" || Shadaab Hashmi || rowspan="3" |Eskay Movies || rowspan="3" |Along with Hridoy Khan, Akassh || rowspan="3" |
|-
|"Aami Shudhu Cheyechi Tomay" || Mohammad Irfan  
|-
|"Calling Bell" || Nakash Aziz, Saberi Bhattacharya  
|-
| rowspan="2" |Bindaas || "Party Shoes" || Shadaab Hashmi, Neha Kakkar ||  rowspan="2" |Shree Venkatesh Films || rowspan="2" |Along with Arindom Chatterjee, Habib Wahid, Devi Sri Prasad, Dev || rowspan="2" |
|-
|"Remix Qawwali" || Nakash Aziz, Neha Kakkar  
|-
|Janla Diye Bou Palalo || All Songs || Abhijit Barman, Anupam Roy, Akriti Kakar, Timir Biswas, Karthik Das Baul || Asha Audio || || 
|-
| rowspan="2" |Yoddha: The Warrior || "Desi Chhori" || Satrujit Dasgupta, Neha Kakkar || rowspan="2" |Shree Venkatesh Films || rowspan="2" |Along with Indraadip Dasgupta || rowspan="2" |
|-
|"Yoddhar Saathe Ebar Pujo Katan" || Nakash Aziz  
|-
| rowspan="9" |2015 || rowspan="3" |Romeo vs Juliet || "Bekheyali Mone" || Shadaab Hashmi || rowspan="3" |Eskay Movies, Jaaz Multimedia || rowspan="3" |Along with Akassh || rowspan="3" |
|-
|"Mahiya Mahiya" || Arindom Chatterjee  
|-
|"Saiyaan" || Zubeen Garg, Akriti Kakkar  
|-
|Ekla Cholo || || || || || 
|-
|Sesh Anka || || || || || 
|-
|Agnee 2 || "Magic Mamoni" || Neha Kakkar || Eskay Movies, Jaaz Multimedia || Along with Akassh || 
|-
|Aashiqui || All Songs || Savvy, Jubin Nautiyal, Kona, Nakash Aziz, Mohammed Irfan, Akriti Kakar, Shadaab Hashmi || Eskay Movies, Jaaz Multimedia || Along with Shadaab Hashmi || 
|-
|Mayer Biye || || || || || 
|-
|Bengal Celebrity League || Midnapore Mighties Anthem Song || Savvy || Dev Entertainment Ventures || Director Raja Chanda, Cast Dev, Sayantika Banerjee, Nusrat Jahan, Joy and More || 
|-
| rowspan="7" |2016 || Hero 420 || All Songs || Nakash Aziz, Mohammed Irfan, Shadaab Hashmi, Ash King, Kalpana Patowary || Eskay Movies, Jaaz Multimedia || ||
|-
|Niyoti || All Songs || Savvy, Lemis, Kona, Runa Laila, Mohammed Irfan, Shaan, Imran Mahmudul, Nancy || Eskay Movies, Jaaz Multimedia || "Onek Sadhonar Pore" is a remake of the song of the same name from the 1998 film Bhalobashi Tomake ||  
|-
| rowspan="3" |Samraat: The King Is Here || "Dujone" || Shadaab Hashmi || rowspan="3" |Tiger Media Limited || rowspan="3" |Along with Dabbu, Imran Mahmudul, Arfin Rumey || rowspan="3" |
|-
|"Dujone (Unplugged)" || Savvy  
|-
|"Dujone (Instrumental)" ||  
|-
| Rokto || "Dhim Tana" || Akriti Kakar || Eskay Movies, Jaaz Multimedia || Along with Akassh || 
|-
|Prem Ki Bujhini || All Songs || Savvy, Ash King, Madhubanti Bagchi, Jayeeta, Shadaab Hashmi, Palak Muchhal, Zubeen Garg || |Eskay Movies, Jaaz Multimedia || || 
|-
| rowspan="4" |2017 || Bibaho Diaries || All Songs || Savvy, Lagnajita Chakraborty, Anupam Roy, Somlata Acharyya Chowdhury || Eros International || || 
|-
| Nabab || All Songs except O DJ O DJ || Shadaab Hashmi, Akriti Kakkar, Ankit Tiwari, Madhura Bhattacharya, Raza Ali Khan || Eskay Movies, Jaaz Multimedia || Along with Akassh || 
|-
| rowspan="2" |Rangbaz || "Ghum Amar" || Jubin Nautiyal, Prashmita Paul ||  rowspan="2" |Unlimited Audio Video || rowspan="2" |Along with Dabbu || 
|-
|"Tui Chad Eider" || Savvy, Nandini Deb ||  
|-
| rowspan="12" |2018 || Noor Jahaan || All Songs || Raj Barman, Prashmita Paul, Imran Mahmudul, Kona, Lagnajita Chakraborty || Shree Venkatesh Films, Jaaz Multimedia || Song "Shona Bondhu" is a cover of the song by Abdul Gafur Hali and was released as a single in 2017
|
|-
|Inspector Notty K || "Moner Kinare" || Raj Barman || Grassroot Entertainment, Jaaz Multimedia || Along with Suddho Roy || 
|-
| rowspan="3" |Bhalo Theko || "Biye" || Savvy, Prashmita Paul || rowspan="3" |Tiger Media Limited || rowspan="3" | || rowspan="3" | 
|-
|"Mon Deewana" || Imran Mahmudul, Gopika
|-
|"Heel" || Savvy, Gopika
|-
|Bizli || Friend Beautiful || Shadaab Hashmi, Madhubanti Bagchi, Madhushree, Armaan Malik || Jaaz Multimedia, Bobstar Films || Along with Akassh, Ahmmed Humayun, Shafiq Tuhin || 
|-
|Chalbaaz || All Songs || Savvy, Shadaab Hashmi, Madhubanti Bagchi, Madhushree, Armaan Malik || Eskay Movies || || 
|-
|Honeymoon || All Songs || Dev Negi, Akriti Kakkar || Surinder Films || ||
|-
|rowspan="2" |Sultan: The Saviour || Masha Allah || Dev Negi, Akriti Kakkar || rowspan="2" | Jeetz Filmworks, Surinder Films || rowspan="2" |Along with Suddho Roy || 
|-
|Aamar Mon || Mohammed Irfan ||  
|-
|Bhaijaan Elo Re || "Bhaijaan Eid E Elo Re" (Title Song) || Abhijeet Bhattacharya || Eskay Movies || Along with Dolaan Mainnakk || 
|-
|Hoichoi Unlimited || All Songs || Abhijeet Bhattacharya, Mika Singh, Madhubanti Bagchi, Armaan Malik, Nikhita Gandhi || Dev Entertainment Ventures || || 
|-
| rowspan="11" |2019 || Shahenshah || Rashik Amar || Savvy, Kona || Unlimited Audio Video || Along with Dabbu || 
|-
|Password || Swag || Imran || SK Films || Along with Lincon, Akassh || 
|-
|Bhokatta || Honey Tor Tufani || Raj Barman || Eskay Movies || Along with Dolaan Mainnakk, Baidyanath Dash || 
|-
|Panther: Hindustan Meri Jaan || Udashi Shon || Ishan Mitra || Jeetz Filmworks || Along with Suddho Roy, Amit-Ishan || 
|-
|17th September|All Songs
|Rupankar, Arnab Dutta, Ishan Mitra, Lagnajita
|Zee Music Company
|
|
|-
| rowspan="4" |Love Story| "Chupi Chupi Mon" || Raj Barman, Prashmita
| rowspan="4" |Surinder Films
| rowspan="4" | Film released in 2020
| rowspan="4" | 
|-
| "Ay Na Aro Kache" || Raj Barman
|-
| "Tui Chara" || Shashwat Singh
|-
| "Danpitey" || Timir Biswas
|-
|rowspan=2 |Password || "Trippy Lage"  || Nikhita Gandhi, Shashwat Singh
|rowspan=2|Zee Music Company
|rowspan=2 | 
|rowspan=2 |
|-
| "Aye Khuda"  || KK
|-
| rowspan="2" |2020
|SOS Kolkata || "Raagi Raja" || Oindrila Sanyal, Nikhita Gandhi, Dev Arijit || || ||
|-
|Switzerland || All Songs || Nakash Aziz, Nikhita Gandhi, Jeet, Dev Negi, Akriti Kakkar, Ishan Mitra || Jeetz Filmworks || ||
|-
| rowspan="1" |2021
|Miss Call || || || Surinder Films || ||
|}

 As singer 

 As lyricist 

 Singles 

 Accolades 

|-
| 2018
| Bibaho Diaries| Best Music Album 
| Filmfare Award
| 
| Filmfare Awards East
| 

|-
| 2019
| Ghare and Baire| Best Music Album Popular Choice
| Mirchi Award
| Won
| 

|-
| 2019
| Hoichoi Unlimited''
| Best Music Director 
| TeleCine Award
| 
| TeleCine Awards

References

External links
 
 Savvy Gupta on Gomolo
 
 

1983 births
Living people
Bengali musicians
Musicians from Kolkata
Indian film score composers
Indian male film score composers